Edoardo  Scarfoglio (September 26, 1860 – October 6, 1917) was an Italian author and journalist, one of the early practitioners in Italian fiction of  realism, a style of writing that embraced direct, colloquial language and rejected the more ornate style of earlier Italian literature.

Biography
Scarfoglio was born in Paganica, in the Abruzzi region of Italy, but lived and worked in Naples much of his life.

As a writer of fiction, his early reputation rests on the novella The Trial of Phryne, published in 1884, a retelling—set in contemporary small-town Italy- of  the trial of Phryne, a Greek courtesan from the fourth century, BCE.  In Scarfoglio's version, a young woman, Mariantonia, guilty of murder, is acquitted simply because she is beautiful. Scarfoglio's tale is well known even to Italians who have not actually read the novella, since it was the basis for an episode in Alessandro Blasetti's popular 1952 film Altri tempi (Other Times), starring Gina Lollobrigida as Phryne/Mariantonia.

As a journalist, Scarfoglio and his wife, Matilde Serao, the best-known woman writer in Italy at the time, founded a number of newspapers:  Corriere di Roma, the Corriere di Napoli, the Ora of Palermo, and, the most prominent, Il Mattino in Naples, still the largest daily newspaper in the city. His name is chiefly associated with the latter paper, which he owned and edited for many years.

He and his wife were responsible for moving Naples into the mainstream of Italian journalism in the early twentieth century by serializing the works of writers such as D'Annunzio.  As an editorialist in his own paper, Scarfoglio supported such policies as Italian expansionism in Africa and the Aegean in the 1890s. He is the father of journalists Carlo Scarfoglio and Antonio Scarfoglio.

Notes

References

External links
 

1860 births
1917 deaths
Italian male writers
People from the Province of L'Aquila
Italian newspaper editors
Italian male journalists